Ben Gunn (born Benjamin Matthews) is a British guitarist who was with The Sisters of Mercy from 1981 to 1983, appearing on several of their early singles.

Ben Gunn joined the band after the band released "The Damage Done", after Craig Adams joined, and the band first started using Doktor Avalanche.

He played on the singles from "Body Electric" until "Temple of Love", despite some people believing he was there only for live purposes. However, he did not play on The Reptile House EP. Subsequently, the band signed to WEA and Ben Gunn quit in disgust, claiming personal differences between himself and Eldritch (the same reason as was later stated when Gary Marx, Wayne Hussey and Craig Adams left between 1984 and 1985). He claimed that the Sisters started as a joke on rock outfits, and now they had become one.

He later played in a band named Torch, and afterwards formed Anabas (on his own label 'Flame On'), releasing two singles under this banner. Whilst in bands he often would not allow himself to be photographed by interviewers.

Following the lack of success for his post-Sisters of Mercy projects, Matthews left the music industry. It is believed he studied economics at Liverpool University and, following post-graduate study, later qualified as an accountant.

Discography
Singles with The Sisters of Mercy

with Torch = TBC (1983)

with Anabas = "Barricades" / "Dream Dance" 7" (Flame On-FLAME 003-1983)

References 

English rock guitarists
The Sisters of Mercy members
Living people
Year of birth missing (living people)